is a Japanese publishing company. With a number of controversial books that disturbed the Japanese society and its erotic manga comics, the company has established itself like a source of provocative "subculture" items.

History 
Ohta Publishing was created in 1985, when it separated from the publishing department of Ohta Production, a talent agency specializing in stand-up comedians.

Initially, from an outside perspective, Ohta Publishing did not seem like a serious company but rather a sort of toy company of Takeshi Kitano (who was an Ohta Production artist back then). It released books that were of interest to Kitano himself.

In 1989, Ohta published the famous book The Age of M about serial child murderer Tsutomu Miyazaki and started establishing itself like a source of provocative "subculture" items. Around the same time, the bi-monthly magazine QuickJapan was founded. In 1993 Ohta released the book The Complete Manual of Suicide and in 1999 Battle Royale, which shook Japanese society.

At the end of the 1990s, the company also started working with manga artist Naoki Yamamoto, dubbed the master of erotics, and founded the manga magazine Manga Erotics. Its successor Manga Erotics F now accounts for a large percentage of all company's manga sales.

Prominent titles 
The company is best known for having published books like The Age of M (1989), The Complete Manual of Suicide (1993) and Battle Royale (1999), other books including The Tatami Galaxy and Eien no Zero, and numerous manga comics. It also publishes the manga magazine Manga Erotics F and the magazine QuickJapan. Some other recent manga titles include Miyamoto kara Kimi e and Kami no Kodomo.

List of periodic and serial publications

Print magazines 
 QuickJapan(ja)
 Manga Erotics F
 Kettle(ja)

Web magazines

Manga 
 Astro Kyūdan
 Bradherley no Basha
 La Croisade des Innocents
 The Devil is So Cute
 Don't Disturb Me and Him, Please
 Don't Say Anymore, Darling
 Drops
 Gente - Ristorante no Hitobito
 A Girl on the Shore
 Hallucination from the Womb
 Keep on Vibrating
 Kokumin Quiz
 Lychee Light Club
 Mariko Parade
 Mikai no Hoshi
 Nijigahara Holograph
 Not Love But Delicious Foods Make Me So Happy!
 Palepoli
 Pico-Pico Boy
 Pico-Pico Boy Turbo
 Punctures
 Ristorante Paradiso
 Romance of an Ancient Dreaming City
 Sennen Gahō
 Sweet Blue Flowers
 The Tales of the Town Uroshima
 Tora & Ken's Happy Lovely Life!
 Tropical Citron - Psychedelic Witch Story
 Utsubora - A Story of a Novelist
 Velveteen & Mandala
 Watching Fuckin' TV All Time Makes a Fool
 Yukiko's Spinach

References

External links 
 

 
Amusement companies of Japan
Publishing companies established in 1985
Magazine publishing companies of Japan
Manga distributors
Japanese companies established in 1985
Book publishing companies of Japan